Henry Topping may refer to:
 Henry Topping (footballer, born 1908), English footballer
 Henry Topping (footballer, born 1915), English footballer

See also
 Harry Topping (1913–2001), English footballer